Avtalion is a community settlement in northern Israel.

History
Located in the Galilee to the south of Arraba, it falls under the jurisdiction of Misgav Regional Council. In  it had a population of .The village was established in 1987 as a moshav shitufi, and was named after Abtalion, a rabbinic sage in the early pre-Mishnaic era. It was later converted to a community settlement. Avtalion is known for its production of olive oil.

References

Community settlements
Agricultural Union
Former moshavim
Populated places established in 1987
1987 establishments in Israel
Populated places in Northern District (Israel)